The Pennsylvania Turnpike is a toll highway operated by the Pennsylvania Turnpike Commission.

Pennsylvania Turnpike may also refer to:
 Pennsylvania Turnpike Commission, agency overseeing the turnpike operations

See also
 Abandoned Pennsylvania Turnpike, the abandoned section of road between Breezewood and Hustontown
 Interstate 376, the Beaver Valley Expressway extension
 Interstate 476, the Northeast Extension
 List of toll roads in Pennsylvania
 Pennsylvania Route 43, the Mon Valley extension
 Pennsylvania Route 66, the Amos K. Hutchinson Bypass extension
 Pennsylvania Route 100, including the Pottstown Pike
 Pennsylvania Route 576, the Southern Beltway extension 
 Pennsylvania Turnpike/Interstate 95 Interchange Project
 Philadelphia and Lancaster Turnpike
 U.S. Route 1 in Pennsylvania including the Baltimore Pike